Tural Akhundov (born on 1 August 1988 in Baku) is an Azerbaijani football player who plays for Keşla in the Azerbaijan Premier League.

Career

Club
On 11 June 2018, Akhundov signed one year contract with Neftçi. Akhundov left Neftçi on 19 June 2020 after his contract expired.

On 22 June 2020, Akhundov signed a one-year contract with Keşla FK.

International
On 23 March 2018, Akhundov made his senior international debut for Azerbaijan game against Belarus.

Career statistics

International

Statistics accurate as of match played 23 March 2018

References

External links
 

1988 births
Living people
Association football fullbacks
Azerbaijani footballers
Azerbaijan under-21 international footballers
Azerbaijan international footballers
Azerbaijan Premier League players
Ravan Baku FC players
Kapaz PFK players
Sumgayit FK players
Neftçi PFK players
Shamakhi FK players